Arkys curtulus, the small bird dropping spider, is a small spider found in eastern Australia. It is usually seen resting on leaves waiting for prey to come near, commonly feasting on soldier flies. Colours and patterns vary considerably, ranging from cream, orange, mottled, brown or black.

References

Araneidae
Spiders of Australia
Fauna of New South Wales
Spiders described in 1903
Taxa named by Eugène Simon